Eduardo Viso Abella (16 December 1919 - 6 July 1995) was a former Spanish football player and football manager. As a player, he played for Deportivo La Coruna and Real Zaragoza in a midfield position.

He coached CD Juvenil, S.C. Braga, Deportivo Saprissa.

He coached the Costa Rica national team in the 1960s, as manager of Costa Rica he oversaw the team's CONCACAF Championship victory in 1969.

References

1919 births
1995 deaths
People from O Ribeiro
Sportspeople from the Province of Ourense
Spanish footballers
Footballers from Galicia (Spain)
La Liga players
Deportivo de La Coruña players
Real Zaragoza players
Spanish football managers
Spanish expatriate football managers
S.C. Braga managers
Deportivo Saprissa managers
L.D. Alajuelense managers
C.S. Herediano managers
Costa Rica national football team managers
Expatriate football managers in Portugal
Expatriate football managers in Costa Rica
Spanish expatriate sportspeople in Portugal
Spanish expatriate sportspeople in Costa Rica
Association football midfielders